Kholodnohirskyi District is an urban district of the city of Kharkiv, Ukraine, named after a neighborhood in the city Kholodna Hora.

The district appeared sometime around 1930 when Ivano-Lysohirskyi District was renamed into Leninskyi District. In 2016 it was renamed into Kholodnohirskyi to comply with decommunization laws.

Places
 Kholodna Hora
 Lysa Hora
 Ivanivka
 Zalyutyne
 Zalopan
 Panasivka
 Laherne
 Hiivka
 Sortyrovka

References

External links
 Leninskyi Raion at the Kharkiv city website
 Leninskyi Raion website

 
Urban districts of Kharkiv